The United States Virgin Islands competed at the 2015 World Aquatics Championships held in Kazan, Russia from 24 July to 9 August 2015.

Swimming

Swimmers from the Virgin Islands have achieved qualifying standards in the following events (up to a maximum of 2 swimmers in each event at the A-standard entry time, and 1 at the B-standard):

Men

Women

References

External links
 Kazan 2015 Official Site

Nations at the 2015 World Aquatics Championships
2015 in United States Virgin Islands sports
Virgin Islands at the World Aquatics Championships